Kim Ghattas (born 1977 in Beirut, Lebanon) is a Dutch-Lebanese journalist for the BBC who has covered the US State Department. She is a scholar at the  Carnegie Endowment for International Peace and the author of Black Wave: Saudi Arabia, Iran, and the Forty-Year Rivalry That Unraveled Culture, Religion, and Collective Memory in the Middle East, which The New York Times recognized as one of the "100 Notable Books of 2020."

Life
Ghattas attended the American University of Beirut, studying political science. At the same time, she worked as an intern at an English-language newspaper in Beirut. She then worked for the Financial Times and the BBC from Beirut. After reporting from the Middle East, in early 2008 she moved to Washington, D.C. to take up a post covering the US State Department.

In 2013, Ghattas wrote a book titled The Secretary: A Journey with Hillary Clinton from Beirut to the Heart of American Power about her travels with Hillary Clinton during Clinton's tenure as Secretary of State. She later covered Clinton's 2016 presidential campaign for the BBC.

Ghattas's second book, Black Wave: Saudi Arabia, Iran, and the Forty-Year Rivalry That Unraveled Culture, Religion, and Collective Memory in the Middle East, is a post-1979 history of the Middle East.

Works 
 The Secretary: A Journey with Hillary Clinton from Beirut to the Heart of American Power, Henry Holt and Company 2013. 
 Black Wave: Saudi Arabia, Iran, and the Forty-Year Rivalry That Unraveled Culture, Religion, and Collective Memory in the Middle East,  Henry Holt in 2020.

References

External links
 
 
 The ghosts of 1979, "Amanpour" CNN. 3 February 2020
 Distorting the Iranian-Saudi Conflict by As`ad AbuKhalil

1977 births
Living people
American University of Beirut alumni
BBC newsreaders and journalists
Financial Times people
Writers from Beirut
Lebanese women journalists
Lebanese journalists
American University of Beirut trustees
Lebanese radio presenters
Lebanese women radio presenters
20th-century Lebanese women writers
20th-century Lebanese writers
21st-century Lebanese women writers
21st-century Lebanese writers